Eagle Lake may refer to:

Cities, towns, townships etc.

Canada
 Eagle Lake, Haliburton County, Ontario
 Eagle Lake, Parry Sound District, Ontario
 Eagle Lake 27, Ontario (Indian reserve)
 Eagle Lake, Kenora District, Ontario

United States
 Eagle Lake, Florida
 Eagle Lake, Illinois
 Eagle Lake, Maine, a New England town
 Eagle Lake (CDP), Maine, the primary village in the town
 Eagle Lake, Minnesota
 Eagle Lake, Texas
 Eagle Lake, Wisconsin

Lakes

Canada
 Eagle Lake (Alberta)
 Eagle Lake (British Columbia)
 Eagle Lake (Ontario)

United States
 Eagle Lake, Alaska, near Bell Island - see List of lakes of Alaska)
 Eagle Lake, in Bradley County, Arkansas
 Eagle Lake (Lassen County), 2nd largest natural lake entirely in California
 Eagle Lake (Desolation Wilderness), California
 Eagle Lake (Tulare County), near Mineral King, California
 Eagle Lake (Florida), on the west side of the town of Eagle Lake, Florida
 Eagle Lake (Maine), at the head of the Allagash Wilderness Waterway
 Eagle Lake (Fish River), one of the Maine Fish River chain of lakes
 Eagle Lake (Waterford Township, Michigan)
 Eagle Lake (Blue Earth County, Minnesota)
 Eagle Lake (Carlton County, Minnesota)
 Eagle Lake (Carver County, Minnesota)
 Eagle Lake, Cottonwood County, Minnesota
 Eagle Lake (Hubbard County, Minnesota)
 Eagle Lake, Martin County, Minnesota
 Eagle Lake, McLeod County, Minnesota
 Eagle Lake, Otter Tail County, Minnesota
 Eagle Lake (St. Louis County, Minnesota)
 Eagle Lake, Warren County, Mississippi
 Eagle Lake (New York)
 Eagle Lake (Oklahoma), Oklahoma County
 Eagle Lake, Texas, Colorado County

See also 
 Lacul Vulturilor (Romanian for "Eagles' lake"), a lake in Buzău County, Romania
 Eagle River (disambiguation)
 Eagle Creek (disambiguation)
 Eagle (disambiguation)